Golf Club Halt was a station which served Alyth Golf Club, in the Scottish county of Perth and Kinross. Also known as Pitcrocknie Platform.

History
Opened by the Caledonian Railway in 1912 it became part of the London Midland and Scottish Railway during the Grouping of 1923, passing on to the Scottish Region of British Railways during the nationalisation of 1948. It was closed by British Railways in 1948.

References

Notes

Sources
 
 
 
 
 Station on navigable O.S. map

Disused railway stations in Perth and Kinross
Former Caledonian Railway stations
Railway stations in Great Britain opened in 1912
Railway stations in Great Britain closed in 1917
Railway stations in Great Britain opened in 1919
Railway stations in Great Britain closed in 1948
1861 establishments in Scotland